Daniel Grant may refer to:

 Daniel Grant (politician) (1826–?), English Member of Parliament for Marylebone
 Danny Grant (ice hockey) (1946–2019), Canadian hockey player
 Danny Grant (footballer), Irish association football player
 Dan Grant, American consultant